This article details the fixtures and results of the Armenia national football team in 2010s.

2010

2011

2012

2013

2014

2015

2016

2017

2018

2019

References

 
 
 
 

2010s
football team results